Stephen Antuan Glover (born June 18, 1988) is an American screenwriter, rapper, actor, and producer. He is known for his work as the head story editor, and one of the writers for the FX comedy-drama Atlanta. He frequently collaborates with his older brother Donald Glover, who plays the lead character in Atlanta and co-stars in Guava Island, also written by Stephen.

Career

Atlanta

Donald Glover hired Stephen, his younger brother, to co-write for Atlanta, despite Stephen having no prior professional experience in writing for television. He did this to satisfy his desire to have an all-black writing team for the show (something that Vulture noted is completely new for the industry), made up mostly of Atlanta citizens, to achieve an accurate portrayal. Publications such as GQ and The Daily Beast have noted that as the lead writer for four episodes in Atlantas first season, Glover's personal experience and his first-hand perspective on black culture in the city of Atlanta is evident within the show's writing, and they have praised this creative approach as being new and fresh for television.

Glover's musical background has also played a substantial role in the creation of one of Atlanta main characters played by Brian Tyree Henry, aspiring rapper Alfred Miles who assumes the rap alias of Paper Boi. In an interview with The Fader, Glover discusses how in the event that Henry could not rap well, the writing staff did not want to force him to rap as his character, and so Glover's brother requested that he instead provide the rapped vocals for the character's song "Paper Boi" that is featured throughout the pilot episode. The instrumental of the song was a beat inspired by Atlanta trap rap production that was made by music producer Chemist, whom Glover considers his go-to producer for his own music outside of Atlanta.

Although his writing has received praise from various outlets for its creativity, experimentation, and humor based in reality, Glover's writing has also provoked minor controversy. The fifth episode of Atlanta, "Nobody Beats the Biebs", for which Glover was the lead writer, features a fictional depiction of the pop star Justin Bieber being portrayed in an exaggerated and negative light, by a black actor, Austin Crute, rather than a white actor. Writing for Slate, journalist Aisha Harris accused Glover of being "coy" while explaining his reasoning for this creative decision in an interview with Vulture, noting his reluctance to comment on the matter in more detail.

Music
GQ describes Glover's music as being more influenced by the grittier and harder elements of Atlanta trap music in comparison to his brother's R&B and indie-inspired work in hip hop under the alias Childish Gambino. In the same GQ interview, fellow Atlanta writer Swank jokingly said that Glover's mother does not understand why his music differs so drastically from that of his brother's. Glover has been featured as a guest rapper under the name Steve G. Lover on every Childish Gambino outing since Gambino's 2012 mixtape Royalty. Glover's first feature on a mainstream studio album was Childish Gambino's 2013 album Because the Internet, and his most recent appearance, apart from his own releases, was on the 2014 Kauai EP, also by his brother.

Glover has stated that he has been making music since the age of 17. His 2011 mixtape Frequent Flyer LP features production from Chemist and Alias Amazin. This was followed by Summer of Steve released in 2012 and featuring production from solely Chemist. The most recent 2016 album, DJ Rhetorik Presents: Rich Black American, features a variety of guests including his brother.

Discography

Mixtapes
Frequent Flyer LP (2011)
Summer of Steve (2012)
High Art (2014)
DJ Rhetorik Presents: Rich Black American (2016)

Filmography

Television

Film

Music videos
 Childish Gambino: "Heartbeat" (2011)

Awards and nominations

References

External links

1990 births
Living people
American rappers
People from Atlanta
People from Stone Mountain, Georgia
21st-century American rappers
Place of birth missing (living people)
American male screenwriters
Former Jehovah's Witnesses